The Palazzo Estense is a Baroque palace built for Francesco III d'Este and the House of Este in Varese, Italy.

The palace was designed by architect Giuseppe Bianchi and was completed in 1760. It became the home, by purchase in 1765, of Francesco III d'Este, Duke of Modena who was also Austrian governor of Lombardy.

Today, the palace houses the civic administration of the local municipal council and hosts conferences and concerts. In May 2010 it hosted a meeting of G6 Interior Ministers.

See also
 Castello Estense in Ferrara, Italy
 Palazzo Schifanoia build for the Este, also in Ferrara, Italy
List of Baroque residences
Villa Toeplitz

References

Estense
Houses completed in 1760
Baroque architecture in Lombardy
Este residences